Aahuti is 1950 Bollywood film produced by L. Shankar and directed by Kulbhushan. The film was released under the banner of Sansar Movietone Ltd.

Cast
 Prem Kant
 Cuckoo
 Indubala
 Vikram Kapoor
 Mumtaz Shanti

Music
"Dil Ke Bas Mein" - Geeta Dutt, Shankar Dasgupta
"Dil Jo Tumko De Diya" - Geeta Dutt
"Lehron Se Khele Chanda" - Geeta Dutt, Shankar Dasgupta 
"Suraj Laga" - Shankar Dasgupta, Geeta Dutt
"Taron Bhari Chunariya" - Geeta Dutt
"Char Dino ki Atkheliya" - Geeta Dutt, Shanti Varma 
"Neha Laga" - Shamshad Begum
"Mar Ke Jeena Bhi Hai" - Shankar Dasgupta 
"Ab Toh Hand Mein Hand Nahin" - Tun Tun
"Agar Bhagwan Tum Humko Kahin Ladki Bana Dete" (male) - S. D. Batish
"Agar Bhagwan Tum Humko Kahin Ladki Bana Dete" (female) - Kalyani Bai

External links
 

1950 films
1950s Hindi-language films
Indian black-and-white films